Guinea v Morocco was the decisive match of group stage at the 1976 African Cup of Nations. The match was played at the Addis Ababa Stadium in Addis Ababa, Ethiopia, on 14 March 1976. Unlike most other Africa Cup of Nations, the 1976 winner was determined by a final group stage, with the final four teams playing in round-robin format, instead of a knockout stage. This was the last edition to feature a final group stage, while previously only the 1959 African Cup of Nations had also promoted this format.

Each team had defeated Egypt, while Morocco had also beaten Nigeria whereas Guinea had drawn against that same opponent. The point difference was in favor of Morocco, who was a single point clear off Guinea. Therefore, Guinea needed to win the last match to claim the title of champions of Africa; any other result would have Morocco take the title for the very first time.

The match ended in a 1−1 draw with Morocco scoring a late equaliser, meaning the North Africans kept the first place in the group and won their only title to date. As of 2019, both Guinea and Morocco had their best Africa Cup of Nations performances in this edition.

Background

In the 1976 African Cup of Nations, the eight qualified teams played in two groups of four, with the best two in each group qualifying for the final round-robin group.

Guinea had won group A with Egypt being runners-up. They had played each other in a 1–1 draw in their match with Guinea later beating Ethiopia and Uganda in their final two matches by the same 2–1 score. Egypt won 2–1 against Uganda and tied 1–1 with Ethiopia in the last group match.

Morocco won their group while Nigeria finished runners-up. Morocco tied 2–2 against Sudan in their first match and later won 1–0 against Zaire. Nigeria had won 4–2 against Zaire and 1–0 against Sudan. By the final group match Nigeria had a one point advantage over Morocco as both teams occupied the first two group B spots, however, the Moroccans beat Nigeria 3–1 and they swapped places.

In the first matches of the final round Morocco beat Egypt 2–1 while Guinea and Nigeria tied their match 1–1. The second matches was a repeat as all teams had played in the previous round. Morocco again beat Nigeria, this time 2–1, and Guinea won their match against Egypt 4–2. By the third and final matches of the tournament only Morocco and Guinea had a chance to win the game. The Moroccans had a one point advantage, meaning Guinea had to win the match in order to win the championship.

Match

Match details

Aftermath

External links
 Guinea vs Morocco Final 11v11.com
 Details at RSSSF
 Details at www.angelfire.com
 footballmundial.tripod.com

References

 
1976
Nations
International association football competitions hosted by Ethiopia
Guinea national football team matches
Morocco national football team matches
Africa Cup Of Nations, 1976
1975–76 in Moroccan football
March 1976 sports events in Africa